Angels of Death is a manga series written by Makoto Sanada and illustrated by Kudan Nazuka, based on a video game of the same name. It began serialization in Media Factory's Monthly Comic Gene magazine in January 2016. A prequel to the video game, Angels of Death Episode.0, also written by Sanada and illustrated by Nazuka, began serialization digitally in Kadokawa's Gene Pixiv on March 3, 2017. A two-volume four-panel manga series titled Satsuten!, written by Sanada and illustrated by Negiyan, was serialized in Comic Gene from February 2017 to January 2018.

Angels of Death

Satsuten!

Episode.0

Art Gallery

References

External links

  
 Anime official website 
 

Chapters
Angels of Death (video game)